This is a list of notable footballers who have played for Scottish club  St Johnstone. Generally, this refers to players who have played 100 or more league matches for the club. Those listed who do not meet this criterion either represented their nation while at the club or are considered to have made significant contributions to the club's history.

Notable players
Key:
 GK — Goalkeeper
 DF — Defender
 MF — Midfielder
 W — Winger
 FW — Forward

Bold type indicates that the player currently plays for the club.

Notes

References

External links
 

Players
 
Saint Johnstone
Association football player non-biographical articles
Players